Volodymyr Tkachenko may refer to:

 Volodymyr Tkachenko (swimmer), a Soviet Olympian from Kiev represented the Armed Forces sports club (SKA)
 Volodymyr Tkachenko (footballer), a Ukrainian footballer

See also
 Tkachenko, a surname
 Vladimir Tkachenko, a Soviet basketball player from Sochi represented the Armed Forces sports club (SKA)